Anders Lundmark (born 18 February 1965) is a Sweden volleyball player. He competed in the men's tournament at the 1988 Summer Olympics.

References

External links
 

1965 births
Living people
Swedish men's volleyball players
Olympic volleyball players of Sweden
Volleyball players at the 1988 Summer Olympics
People from Örnsköldsvik Municipality
Sportspeople from Västernorrland County